Pebbair is now a Municipal corporation and a Municipal corporation in Wanaparthy district in the state of Telangana, India. The Pebbair Municipal corporation extends from Pampuram village in the North to Yaparla village in the south..

Geography
It has an average elevation of 300 metres (987 ft).

Community
Pebbair is now a Municipal corporation, having 29 villages and 15 schools 3 Junior Colleges, 2 Degree colleges, 1 B.Ed College, 2 D.Ed Colleges, 1 Polytechnic college for girls.

The farmer's Saturday market in Pebbair is popular for Bullocks, Ongole breed oxen, sheep and goat. People from all over the state and even from nearby states like Karnataka and Tamil Nadu also come here to buy cattle among the large variety, that are bought to sold here. Any Saturday before a festival is more or less like a small size kumbamela.  Until the 1980s it was a drought prone area, but slowly emerged into a good rice producer due to abundant water supply from Joorala Project. Pebbair and the nearby areas produce fruits like Mangoes, Sapotas, Custard Apples, and Water Melons.If you are here or passing through Pebbair you must surely stop here to buy delicious mangoes and watermelon in summer or custard apples in winter.

Beechupally is a famous pilgrimage (devastanam) near Pebbair (10 kilometers) with Krishna River flowing through it. The historical hill (konda) called the Nizam Konda in middle of the river, which once had a fort, had the movie Kondaveeti Raja (starring Chiranjeevi) shot here. There are also two temples near Krishna River namely Rama and Hanuman temples. The Agriculture land in Pebbair is irrigated by Jurala Left Canal & Mahaboopal Pond.

Pebbair is located on highway No. 44 Old NH 7, longest highway in India running from Varanasi to Kanyakumari, 156 km South of Hyderabad towards Kurnool.

Temples
Srirangapuram located 10 kilometers from Pebbair is famous for Sri Ranganayaka Swamy Temple, where movies AADI, Chatrapati, Chennakeshava Reddy, and Yamadonga were filmed. Pathapally village is famous for Lord Hanuman Temple which is 8 Km from Pebbair. This Hanuman temple is well known as sri chintakunta anjaneya swamy temple.

Other Temples in Pebbair include the Shirdi Sai Baba, the Hanuman, Brahmamgari temple, Santha bazar, Venugopala swamy, Ayyappa, Sri Sri Sri Mallishwari Devi Temple, Chowdeshwari Amma Vaaru, Sri kodanda Rama swamy temple, Venkatapuram, this is one of the oldest temple and the Vasavi Kanyaka Parameswari. Every year people here celebrate the Chowdeshwari Jatara.

Politics 
Pebbair village has 4 MPTC seats and 16 wards. Akki Shusheela was elected 31 July 2013 as a Sarpanch and Puru Padmavathi was elected as a MPP of Pebbair.

Social media 
Pebbair has a Facebook community, named "Pebbair Mandal" with over 1200+ members Orkut community, named "Pebbair-our heaven", with over 150 members.

Education
There are nearly 10 well established schools with a few hostel facilities. Among them Sri Chaitanya Vidyalayam, Gandhi Public School, Saraswathi Vidyanikethan, Ragavendra Public School, MasterMind School are a few. Pebbair has a private Junior College and a Government Junior College, and a B.Ed College is expected soon.

Census 2011

Pebbair Mandal - Wanaparthy 
List of all towns and villages in Pebbair Mandal of Wanaparthy district, Telangana. Complete details of population, religion, literacy and sex ratio in tabular format.

References

Mandals in Wanaparthy district